Meshir 7 - Coptic Calendar - Meshir 9

The eighth day of the Coptic month of Meshir, the sixth month of the Coptic year. On a common year, this day corresponds to February 2, of the Julian Calendar, and February 15, of the Gregorian Calendar. This day falls in the Coptic Season of Shemu, the season of the Harvest. On this day, the Coptic Church celebrates the Feast of the Presentation of Christ in the Temple, one of the Minor Feasts of the Lord.

Commemorations

Feasts 

 The Feast of the Presentation of the Lord Christ in the Temple

Martyrs 

 The martyrdom of the Twenty-One Coptic Martyrs, in Libya

Saints 

 The departure of Saint Simeon the Elder

References 

Days of the Coptic calendar